George Lewis Gilham (September 8, 1899 – April 25, 1937) was a catcher in Major League Baseball. He played for the St. Louis Cardinals.

References

External links

1899 births
1937 deaths
Major League Baseball catchers
St. Louis Cardinals players
Baseball players from Pennsylvania
Suffolk Nuts players